The 2022 Open Feu Aziz Zouhir was a professional tennis tournament played on outdoor hard courts. It was the first edition of the tournament which was part of the 2022 ITF Women's World Tennis Tour. It took place in Monastir, Tunisia between 10 and 16 October 2022.

Champions

Singles

  Kristina Mladenovic def.  Tamara Zidanšek, 6–1, 3–6, 7–5

Doubles

  Priska Madelyn Nugroho /  Wei Sijia def.  Isabelle Haverlag /  Suzan Lamens, 6–3, 6–2

Singles main draw entrants

Seeds

 1 Rankings are as of 3 October 2022.

Other entrants
The following players received wildcards into the singles main draw:
  Chiraz Bechri
  Feryel Ben Hassen
  Evgeniya Rodina
  Tamara Zidanšek

The following players received entry from the qualifying draw:
  Gina Feistel
  Oana Gavrilă
  Julia Lohoff
  Edda Mamedova
  Priska Madelyn Nugroho
  Caroline Roméo
  Marie Villet
  Radka Zelníčková

The following players received entry as a lucky loser:
  Maria Vittoria Viviani

References

External links
 2022 Open Feu Aziz Zouhir at ITFtennis.com
 Official website

2022 ITF Women's World Tennis Tour
2022 in Tunisian sport
October 2022 sports events in Africa